The 2018 season is Port's 22nd season in the Thai League, FA Cup, League Cup.

Name's changes
This is Port F.C.'s name changing.
 1967–2009 as Port Authority of Thailand Football Club (Port Authority of Thailand)
 2009–2013 as  Thai Port Football Club (Thai Port)
 2013–2015 as Singhtarua Football Club (Singhtarua)
 2015–present as "Port Football Club" (Port)

Players
Players and squad numbers last updated on 6 February 2018.Note: Flags indicate national team as has been defined under FIFA eligibility rules. Players may hold more than one non-FIFA nationality.

Thai League

Thai FA Cup

Thai League Cup

Squad statistics

Reserve team in Thai League 4

Port send the reserve team to compete in T4 Bangkok Metropolitan Region as Port B.

Overall summary

Season Summary

Score overview

Transfers
First Thai footballer's market is opening on 14 November 2017 to 5 February 2018
Second Thai footballer's market is opening on 11 June 2018 to 9 July 2018

In

Out

Loan in

Loan out

Notes

References

External links
 Port F.C. Official Website
 Thai League Official Website

2018
Association football in Thailand lists
POR